John Theodore Tapley (September 22, 1911 – December 26, 1956) was an American Negro league third baseman in the 1930s.

A native of Winona, Mississippi, Tapley attended Pontiac High School in Pontiac, Michigan. He was the brother of fellow Negro leaguer Townsend Tapley, and played for the Akron Black Tyrites in 1933. Tapley died in Pontiac in 1956 at age 45.

References

External links
 and Seamheads

1911 births
1956 deaths
Akron Black Tyrites players
Baseball third basemen
Baseball players from Mississippi
People from Winona, Mississippi
20th-century African-American sportspeople